Margaret Skok is a former Canadian diplomat and ambassador to the Republic of Kazakhstan, the Kyrgyz Republic and the Republic of Tajikistan serving from September 2006 to October 2009. She is also a Senior Fellow, at Carleton University, Norman Paterson School of International Affairs.

Career 

Her federal career began with the Royal Canadian Mounted Police, Canada Employment and Immigration, and Parks Canada, working in Ottawa and Montreal.

She was a senior fellow at  Centre for International Governance Innovation. She was involved in building cooperation to Kazakhstan

Works 

 Canada’s got a future on the modern Silk Road Centre for International Governance Innovation, December 16, 2015

References

External links 

Canadian diplomats
Living people
Ambassadors of Canada to Kazakhstan
Ambassadors of Canada to Kyrgyzstan
Ambassadors of Canada to Tajikistan
Canadian women ambassadors
Year of birth missing (living people)